The 1952 United States presidential election in Missouri took place on November 4, 1952, as part of the 1952 United States presidential election. Voters chose 13 representatives, or electors, to the Electoral College, who voted for president and vice president.

Missouri was won by Columbia University President Dwight D. Eisenhower (R–New York), running with Senator Richard Nixon, with 50.71% of the popular vote, against Adlai Stevenson (D–Illinois), running with Senator John Sparkman, with 49.14% of the popular vote.

Missouri weighed in for this election as slightly over 9% more Democratic than the nation-at-large. It was the only state that Eisenhower won in 1952 that would flip to Stevenson four years later.

Results

Results by county

See also
 United States presidential elections in Missouri

References

Missouri
1952
1952 Missouri elections